"Esta Vida Tuya Y Mía" (English: This Life Yours and Mine) is a Latin pop song written and performed by Kany García. The song was chosen as the second single from Kany's second album, Boleto De Entrada. The song was released to radio in United States and Puerto Rico on January 12, 2010.

Charts

References

2010 singles
Kany García songs
Songs written by Kany García
2008 songs
Sony BMG singles